Events in the year 2014 in Kosovo.

Incumbents 
 President: Atifete Jahjaga
 Prime Minister: Hashim Thaçi (until December 9) Isa Mustafa (since December 9)

Events 
 7 May – President Jahjaga confirmed the date of the upcoming parliamentary elections was to take place on 8 June.
 8 June – The 2014 Kosovan parliamentary election took place.

Deaths

See also 

 2014 in Europe

References 

 
Kosovo
Kosovo
2010s in Kosovo
Years of the 21st century in Kosovo